Coasting is a travel book by Jonathan Raban. It has received a positive review by Beryl Bainbridge.

Plot summary 
Written as a travelogue, Coasting describes Jonathan Raban's single-handed 4,000 mile voyage around Britain which he made in 1982 (at the age of 40) in an old restored 32-foot sea-going ketch, the Gosfield Maid.  Raban sailed with a chart and a hand bearing-compass; he sailed by the look of the coastline.  His story takes various digressions, just as his journey does, as he mulls over his childhood as the son of a vicar in the Church of England, and the current state of Britain under Margaret Thatcher during the time of the Falklands War.

Chapter Two is a description of the dogged insularity of the Manx, who he compares to the Falkland Islanders, whilst the Isle of Man becomes a metaphor for the insularity of the larger island on which he himself had been brought up and lived up till this point.  Raban himself has commented on his own attitude to England and the influence of Margaret Thatcher on Britain at the time of writing his book.  The British he sees as being famous for their insular arrogance and condescension. As he describes them:
 

 
The author is equally bitter about the dominant, hectoring Mrs Thatcher.  Whilst comfortably moored up in the Gosfield Maid on a beautiful stretch of the River Yealm, he tunes into the House of Commons debate on the Falklands invasion.  The Prime Minister talks about sovereign territory being invaded by a foreign power, but to Raban '...her cross, nanny's voice made it sound as if there had been ructions in the nursery and the children were going to be sent to bed without any tea.'  He considers equally absurd the majority of MPs who are baying for Argentinian blood.  Raban turns his radio off in disgust, '...sick of the sound of growning men baying like a wolf pack. It wasn't a debate, it was a verbal bloodletting, with words standing for the guns and bayonets that would come later when the fleet reached the islands.' and adds, 'Listening to it, I felt that I'd been eavesdropping on the nastier workings of the national subconscious; I'd overheard Britain talking in a dream, and what it was saying scared me stiff.'
 
And it is his negative feelings towards an increasingly alien Britain under the dominance of Thatcher that finally persuade him to make the decision to leave his homeland, although the paradox is that they share a like-minded attitude towards its rigid social hierarchy:
 

 
The book is remarkable for its penetrating and highly perceptive insights into the character and state of the British nation at the time of writing. One also has to greatly admire him for taking on the challenge of a single-handed voyage around the British Isles, a feat that requires great personal courage on the part of the sailor. For most of the book, Raban, rather like Joyce, is able to form an objectively detached view of his country whilst out at sea on board his boat. However, rather than taking the battering ram approach of his eccentric predecessors (men like Middleton, McMullen, and Hilaire Belloc), he uses beautifully crafted language to describe the life of a single-handed sailor in great awe of the sea, with detailed almost lyrical descriptions of the characters he encounters along the way. Two passages that particularly stand out are of Raban's rather hostile meeting with Paul Theroux at Brighton Marina, himself in the midst of researching a similar book about Britain, and a much friendlier one with Philip Larkin at Hull, a city Raban knows well from his student days while working as a part-time minicab driver.

Criticism
Probably one of the best descriptions in the book is of the author's life as a child growing up in assorted Church of England vicarages, in a kind of social no-man's land, unable to mix with the council estate children opposite because they are socially inferior but also out of place in upper class society since a vicar's stipend was about £700 a year, equal to that of a skilled labourer living on a council estate. Raban sums his family's situation up in his own clinically detached manner: 'We belonged nowhere, We had the money of one lot, the voices of another - and we had an unearthly goodliness which removed us from the social map altogether.'

References

1986 non-fiction books
British travel books
English non-fiction books
American travel books
Books about the United Kingdom